Sublimis Deus (English: The sublime God; erroneously cited as Sublimus Dei and occasionally as Sic Dilexit) is a bull promulgated by Pope Paul III on June 2, 1537, which forbids the enslavement of the indigenous peoples of the Americas (called "Indians of the West and the South") and all other people who could be discovered later. It states that the Indians are fully rational human beings who have rights to freedom and private property, even if they are heathen. Another related document is the ecclesiastical letter Pastorale officium, issued May 29, 1537, and usually seen as a companion document to Sublimis Deus.

There is still some controversy about how this bull is related to the documents known as Veritas ipsa, Unigenitus Deus and Pastorale officium (May 29, 1537). Alberto de la Hera believes that Veritas ipsa and Unigenitus Deus are simply other versions of Sublimis Deus, and not separate bulls. Joel Panzer sees Veritas ipsa as an earlier draft of Sublimis Deus. While some scholars see Sublimis Deus as a primary example of Papal advocacy of Indian rights, others see it as part of an inconsistent and politically convenient stance by Paul III, who later removed all ecclesiastical penalties (interdict and excommunication) for any violation of the terms of the document Sublimis Deus or the Pastorale in 1538.

In Sublimis Deus, Paul III declares the indigenous peoples of the Americas to be "truly men and that they are not only capable of understanding the Catholic Faith but, according to our information, they desire exceedingly to receive it", and denounces any idea to the contrary as directly inspired by the "enemy of the human race". He goes on to condemn their reduction to slavery in the strongest terms, declaring it null and void for any people known as well as any that could be discovered in the future, entitles their right to liberty and property, and concludes with a call for their evangelization.

The bull had a strong impact on the Valladolid debate. Its principles became part of New Laws issued by Charles V in Spain, although such laws were often ignored by the colonists and conquistadores themselves. The executing brief for the bull ("Pastorale Officium") was annulled by Paul in 1537 at the request of the Spanish who had rescinded the decree previously issued by Charles.

Background
In late spring of 1452 Byzantine Emperor Constantine XI wrote to Pope Nicholas for help against the impending siege of Constantinople  by Ottoman Sultan Mehmed the Conqueror. Nicholas issued the bull Dum Diversas (18 June 1452) authorizing King Alfonso V of Portugal to "attack, conquer, and subjugate Saracens, pagans and other enemies of Christ wherever they may be found". Issued less than a year before the Fall of Constantinople in 1453, the bull may have been intended to begin another crusade against the Ottoman Empire. Furthermore, the bull Romanus Pontifex (1455) gave the right of taking for reason of punishment for crime saracens (who, as Muslims in general were slavers themselves, often capturing Christians) and pagans as perpetual slaves.

With the realization that the Americas represented regions of the Earth of which the Europeans were not aware earlier, there arose intense speculation over the question whether the natives of these lands were true humans or not. Together with that went a debate over the (mis)treatment of these natives by the Conquistadores and colonists. The main impetus for Sublimis Deus was a council held by prominent Missionaries in Mexico in 1537, including Archbishop Juan de Zumárraga, Bartolomé de Las Casas and Bishop of Puebla Julián Garcés. They discussed the methods of converting the natives, especially the Franciscan practice of mass baptism. Basing a recommendation to the pope on Las Casas' treatise on how to convert the Indians, "De Unico Vocationis Modo", they sent a letter to Rome with Dominican friar named Bernardino de Minaya (born c. 1489).  In 1537, Minaya arrived in Rome and pleaded his case on behalf of the Indians.

In response, Paul issued Sublimis Deus on June 2, 1537.  "Pastorale officium", a papal brief apparently used in conjunction with the Sublimis Deus by Minaya, declared automatic excommunication for anyone who failed to abide by the new ruling. Stogre (1992) notes that Sublimis Deus is not present in Denzinger, the authoritative compendium of official teachings of the Catholic Church, and that the executing brief for it ("Pastorale officium") was annulled the following year. Davis (1988) asserts it was annulled  due to a dispute with the Spanish crown. The Council of The West Indies and the Crown concluded that the documents broke their patronato rights and the Pope withdrew them, though they continued to circulate and be quoted by La Casas and others who supported Indian rights.

According to Falkowski (2002) Sublimis Deus had the effect of revoking Pope Alexander VI's bull Inter caetera but still leaving the colonizers the duty of converting the native people. Prein (2008) observes the difficulty in reconciling these decrees with Inter caetera.

Father Gustavo Gutierrez describes Sublimis Deus as the most important papal document relating to the condition of native Indians and that it was addressed to all Christians. Maxwell (1975) notes that the bull did not change the traditional teaching that the enslavement of Indians was permissible if they were considered "enemies of Christendom" as this would be considered by the Church as a "just war". Stogre (1992) further argues that the Indian nations had every right to self-defense. Rodney Stark (2003) describes the bull as "magnificent" and believes the reason that, in his opinion, it has belatedly come to light is due to the neglect of Protestant historians. Falola asserts that the bull related to the native populations of the New World and did not condemn  the transatlantic African slave trade stimulated by the Spanish monarchy and the Holy Roman Emperor.

See also
Protector of the Indians
Catholic Church and the Age of Discovery
Laws of Burgos

References

Sources
 The problem of slavery in Western culture, David Brion Davis, Oxford University Press US, 1988, 
 Indigenous peoples and human rights, Patrick Thornberry, Manchester University Press, 2002, 
 Slavery and the Catholic Church, The history of Catholic teaching concerning the moral legitimacy of the institution of slavery, John Francis Maxwell, 1975, Chichester Barry-Rose, 
 The Popes and Slavery, Father Joel S Panzer, The Church In History Centre, 22 April 2008 , retrieved 9 August 2009
 That the world may believe: the development of Papal social thought on aboriginal rights, Michael Stogre S.J, Médiaspaul, 1992, 
 "The Truth About the Catholic Church and Slavery", Rodney Stark, Christianity Today, 7 January 2003 The Truth About the Catholic Church and Slavery
Encyclopedia of the middle passage, Toyin Falola,  Amanda Warnock, Greenwood Publishing Group, 2007, =
 That the world may believe: the development of Papal social thought on aboriginal rights, Michael Stogre S.J, Médiaspaul, 1992, 
 Religions and the abolition of slavery - a comparative approach, W. G. Clarence-Smith Professor William Gervase Clarence-Smith | Staff | SOAS University of London, Professor of the Economic History of Asia and Africa, University of London, retrieved 11 August 2009 
 The Encyclopedia Of Christianity, Volume 5, Wm. B. Eerdmans Publishing, 2008, 
Christianity in the Caribbean: essays on church history, Armando Lampe, 2001, University of the West Indies Press,

Further reading 
 Stamatov, Peter. "Pro-Indigenist Advocacy in the Iberian Atlantic", 2013, Cambridge University Press

External links
 English translation of Sublimus Dei
 

16th-century Catholicism
Abolitionism in South America
16th century in Portugal
16th century in Spain
1537 works
Christianity and law in the 16th century
16th-century papal bulls
Indigenous land rights
Catholicism and slavery
Documents of Pope Paul III
Papal encyclicals
1537 in Christianity